Lisa Ryckbosch is the current director of Professional, Corporate & Community Relations at DePaul University.  She previously served as the head coach of the UIC Flames women's basketball team from 2002 to 2011 and holds the record for most wins in UIC women's basketball history.  In her fifth season as head coach, the Flames made their first post-season appearance in the WNIT following their best-ever finish in the Horizon League. Upon completion of the 2010–11 season, her record with the flames was 128–139.  Ryckbosch came to UIC after eleven seasons as an assistant coach at Depaul, from 1991 until 2002, and one season as an assistant coach at UIC from 1990 to 1991.  Ryckbosch graduated from Loyola in 1984 after starting for the Ramblers for four years and serving as a team captain for two seasons, and in 2006 was inducted in Loyola's Athletics Hall of Fame.  After graduation she began her coaching career at Hillcrest High School in Country Club Hills, Illinois, where she served as the Head Girls' Varsity Basketball Coach and a math teacher for three years.

Head coaching record

References

Living people
American women's basketball coaches
American women's basketball players
UIC Flames women's basketball coaches
High school basketball coaches in the United States
Loyola Ramblers women's basketball players
Place of birth missing (living people)
Year of birth missing (living people)